Stapel is a municipality in the district of Schleswig-Flensburg, in Schleswig-Holstein, Germany. It was created in March 2018 by the merger of the former municipalities of Norderstapel and Süderstapel.

References

Municipalities in Schleswig-Holstein
Schleswig-Flensburg